The Kriya Yoga Express, formerly known as Howrah–Hatia Express, is a Superfast Express of Indian Railways in India's South Eastern Railway zone that runs between  and , serving the Indian states of West Bengal and Jharkhand. It operates as train number 18615 from Howrah Junction to Hatia and as train number 18616 in the reverse direction.

On 21 June 2015, the first International Day of Yoga, the Kriya Yoga Express adopted this name to commemorate the contributions of Kriya Yoga master Paramahansa Yogananda in spreading the teaching and preactice of yoga worldwide. This train had been instrumental in the life and spiritual journey of Paramahansa.

Coaches
The 18615 / 16 Kriya Yoga Express presently has 1 AC First Class, 2 AC 2 Tier, 4 AC 3 Tier, 3 AC 3 Tier Economy, 8 Sleeper Class, 2 General Unreserved & 2 EOG Coaches. One of the EOG Coach is used for Railway Mail Service. It does not carry a pantry car.

Service
The 18615 Kriya Yoga Express covers the distance of 421 kilometres in 09 Hours (47km/hr) & in 08 Hours 50 Mins as 18616 Hatia–Howrah Express (47km/hr).

As the average speed of the train is below , as per Indian Railways rules, its fare does not include a Superfast surcharge.

Routeing

It reverses direction of travel at Muri Junction.

Traction
As the route is fully electrified, a -based WAP-7 powers the train for its entire journey.

Timings
18615 Kriya Yoga Express leaves Howrah Junction on a daily basis at 21:30 hrs IST and reaches Hatia at 06:05 hrs IST the next day.

18616 Kriya Yoga Express leaves Hatia on a daily basis at 21:45 hrs IST and reaches Howrah Junction at 06:30 hrs IST the next day.

References

External links

Rail transport in Howrah
Transport in Ranchi
Named passenger trains of India
Rail transport in West Bengal
Rail transport in Jharkhand
Paramahansa Yogananda
Express trains in India